Montividiu do Norte is a municipality in Goiás state, Brazil. It is a part of the Porangatu Microregion. It had a population in 2020 of 4,509. It became a municipality in 1993.

Location
Montividiu do Norte is located in the extreme north of the state, only 34 km. south of the border from the state of Tocantins. It is situated between two rivers: Rio Santa Teresa and Rio Canabrava, both of which are tributaries of the Tocantins River.
Distance to Goiânia: 444 km
Distance to Porangatu: 61 km

Highway connections to Goiânia are made by GO-080 / Nerópolis / São Francisco de Goiás / BR-153 / Jaraguá / GO-080 / Goianésia / Barro Alto / BR-080 / GO-342 / BR-153 / Uruaçu / Santa Tereza de Goiás / GO-241 / Formoso / GO-142 / Trombas.

Montividiu do Norte is surrounded by the following municipalities: 
north: Tocantins 
east: Porangatu 
west: Minaçu 
south: Trombas

Demographics
In 2007, the population density was 3.30 inhabitants/km2. The population has been growing rapidly since the first count in 1996, when it was 2,610. The population is almost evenly distributed between urban and rural areas. The growth rate between 1996 and 2007 was 4.85%.

Politics
In February 2007, the Mayor was Misael Antônio Teixeira. The city council had nine members, and there were 2,899 eligible voters in 2007.

Economy
The economy is based on agriculture, cattle raising, services, public administration, and small transformation industries. In 2007, there was one industrial unit and 30 retail units. There were no financial institutions in the town in 2005. There were 127 automobiles, 14 trucks, 51 pickup trucks, and 187 motorcycles (2007). (IBGE)

As of 2006, there were 74,600 head of cattle, of which 6,200 were milk cows. Poultry and swine production was modest. The main agricultural products were rice, bananas, sugarcane, corn, and soybeans. None exceeded 1,000 hectares in planted area.

Agricultural Census (2006)
Farms: 699
Planted area: 796 hectares
Natural Pasture: 80,871 hectares
Woodland: 24,811 hectares
Persons occupied related to the farm owner: 1,513
Persons occupied not related to farm owner: 66 (IBGE)

Health and education

As of 2007, there were no hospitals and one walk-in health clinic. The infant mortality rate was 48.95%—one of the highest in the state.

As of 2006, the school system had nine schools with 1,364 students. There were no institutions of higher learning. The adult literacy rate was 80.9%.

Municipal Human Development Index
Municipal Human Development Index MHDI: 0.659
State ranking: 232 (out of 242 municipalities)
National ranking: 3,629 (out of 5,507 municipalities)

Index of Economic Development (Seplan 2001)
225/246 municipalities. See Seplan

Index of Social Development (Seplan 2000)
241/246 municipalities. See Seplan

See also
 List of municipalities in Goiás

References

Frigoletto

Municipalities in Goiás